The voiced  bilabial nasal is a type of consonantal sound which has been observed to occur in about 96% of spoken languages. The bilabial nasal occurs in English, and it is the sound represented by "m" in map and rum. Very few languages (e.g. Wyandot) are known to lack this sound. A small number of languages have been observed to lack independent nasal phonemes altogether, such as Quileute, Makah, and Central Rotokas.

Features 

Features of the voiced bilabial nasal:

Varieties

Occurrence

Palatalized

Velarized

See also 
 List of phonetics topics

Notes

References

External links 
 
 
 

Bilabial consonants
Pulmonic consonants
Nasal consonants
Labial–coronal consonants
Voiced consonants